The 2011 Copa América Final was the final match of the 2011 Copa América, an international football tournament that was played in Argentina from 1 to 24 July 2011. The match was played on 24 July at Estadio Monumental Antonio Vespucio Liberti in Buenos Aires, between Uruguay and Paraguay.

Uruguay won the match 3–0 to earn their 15th Copa América; Paraguay, as the tournament runner-up, earned the Copa Bolivia.
With the win, Uruguay earned the right to represent CONMEBOL in the 2013 FIFA Confederations Cup in Brazil.

Background

The final marked the first time since 2001 that neither Argentina and Brazil competed against each other for the title. Both Uruguay and Paraguay entered the match having previously won the competition multiple times. Uruguay held the joint record of 14 Copa América titles, having had last won it in 1995. Their last final appearance was in 1999, when they were defeated by Brazil. 

Paraguay is a two-time winner of the competition, having last won the tournament in 1979. That year also marked the last time Paraguay made it to the final of the tournament. Paraguay reached the final without winning a single game in the tournament.

Route to the final

Match details

|valign="top"|
|valign="top"|
|valign="top" width="50%"|

|}

References

External links

Copa América 2011 (archived)

Final
Uruguay national football team matches
Paraguay national football team matches
Copa América finals
Copa
 
Football in Buenos Aires
Sports competitions in Buenos Aires
2010s in Buenos Aires
July 2011 sports events in South America